Shooting sports events have been held at every Asian Games since 1954 Asian Games in Manila.

Editions

Medal table

List of records

List of medalists

External links
Asian Shooting Federation

 
Shooting
Asian Games
Asian GAmes